Minna Karhu (born 2 November 1971) is a Finnish freestyle skier. She was born in Vantaa. She competed at the 1992 Winter Olympics, at the 1994 Winter Olympics in Lillehammer, and at the 1998 and 2002 Winter Olympics. Her best Olympic achievement was sixth place in women's moguls in Nagano in 1998.

References

External links 
 

1971 births
Living people
Sportspeople from Vantaa
Finnish female freestyle skiers
Olympic freestyle skiers of Finland
Freestyle skiers at the 1992 Winter Olympics
Freestyle skiers at the 1994 Winter Olympics
Freestyle skiers at the 1998 Winter Olympics
Freestyle skiers at the 2002 Winter Olympics